The 1920 State of the Union Address was written by the 28th president of the United States, Woodrow Wilson, on Tuesday, December 7, 1920. It was his last address to both houses of the 66th United States Congress. Warren Harding became president on Friday, March 4, 1921. He said, "By this faith, and by this faith alone, can the world be lifted out of its present confusion and despair. It was this faith which prevailed over the wicked force of Germany. You will remember that the beginning of the end of the war came when the German people found themselves face to face with the conscience of the world and realized that right was everywhere arrayed against the wrong that their government was attempting to perpetrate."  He is referring to how the United States contributed to the victory of World War I.

References

State of the Union addresses
Presidency of Woodrow Wilson
Speeches by Woodrow Wilson
66th United States Congress
State of the Union Address
State of the Union Address
State of the Union Address
State of the Union Address
December 1920 events in the United States